Jena Romanticism (also the Jena Romantics or Early Romanticism (Frühromantik)) is the first phase of Romanticism in German literature represented by the work of a group centred in Jena from about 1798 to 1804. The movement is considered to have contributed to the development of German idealism in late modern philosophy.

Overview
The group of Jena Romantics was led by Caroline Schlegel, who hosted their meetings. Two members of the group, brothers August Wilhelm and Friedrich von Schlegel, who laid down the theoretical basis for Romanticism in the circle’s organ, the Athenaeum, maintained that the first duty of criticism was to understand and appreciate the right of genius to follow its natural bent.

The greatest imaginative achievement of this circle is to be found in the lyrics and fragmentary novels of Georg Philipp Friedrich Freiherr von Hardenberg (better known by the pseudonym "Novalis"). The works of Johann Gottlieb Fichte and Friedrich Wilhelm Joseph Schelling expounded the Romantic doctrine in philosophy, whereas the theologian Friedrich Schleiermacher demonstrated the necessity of individualism in religious thought. Other notable representatives of the movement include August Ludwig Hülsen and Friedrich Hölderlin.

By 1804, the circle in Jena had dispersed. A second phase of Romanticism was initiated two years later in Heidelberg with Heidelberg Romanticism and in Berlin with Berlin Romanticism.

See also 
 Absolute idealism
 Romantic hermeneutics
 Sturm und Drang
 Weimar Classicism

Notes

References 
 "Jena Romanticism". In Encyclopædia Britannica. Retrieved November 20, 2009, from Encyclopædia Britannica Online: <http://www.britannica.com/EBchecked/topic/302535/Jena-Romanticism>.

Romanticism
Jena